In mathematics, there are a large number of topics named in honor of Norbert Wiener (1894 – 1964). 
 Abstract Wiener space
 Classical Wiener space
 Paley–Wiener integral
 Paley–Wiener theorem
 Wiener algebra
 Wiener amalgam space
 Wiener chaos expansion
 Wiener criterion
 Wiener deconvolution
 Wiener definition
 Wiener entropy
 Wiener equation
 Wiener filter
Generalized Wiener filter
 Wiener's lemma
 Wiener process
 Generalized Wiener process
 Wiener sausage
 Wiener series
 Wiener–Hopf method
 Wiener–Ikehara theorem
 Wiener–Khinchin theorem
 Wiener–Kolmogorov prediction
 Wiener–Lévy theorem
 Weiner–Rosenblueth model
 Wiener–Wintner theorem
 Wiener's tauberian theorem

Wiener